= Taoyuan Football Association =

The Taoyuan Football Association (Chinese: 桃園縣足球協會; pinyin: Táoyuán Xiàn Zúqiú Xiéhuì), founded on October 27, 2002, is a Taiwanese non-governmental organization. Its purpose is to promote children's football in Taoyuan City.

== See also ==
- Chinese Taipei Football Association
